Khalid Ranjha is a Pakistani lawyer and a politician from Punjab, Pakistan. He also served as Federal Law Minister of Pakistan in 2002 and a member of the Senate of Pakistan. He remained Advocate General Punjab, Judge Lahore High Court and the President of Lahore High Court Bar Association, Lahore

Educational background
Khalid Ranjha studied at St. Anthony's High School, Government College University, Lahore and at the University of London, where he received his PhD degree, eventually becoming a Research Fellow at the Institute of Advanced Legal Studies, University of London.

Political career
He is a former senator for Punjab and was affiliated with Pakistan Muslim League (Q). He was also affiliated with Standing Committee on Law, Justice, Human Rights and Parliamentary Affairs. He also served as Law Minister in the federal cabinet of General Pervez Musharaf in 2002.

Positions held
Member Punjab Bar Council 
Vice-Chairman, Punjab Bar Council
President, Lahore High Court Bar Association 
Advocate General Punjab 
Judge, Lahore High Court 
Law Minister, Minorities Affairs, Government of Punjab, Pakistan
Federal law minister, Government of Pakistan in 2002 
 Rector, Institute of Management Sciences (Lahore)

References

Pakistani lawyers
Punjabi people
Pakistan Muslim League politicians
Government College University, Lahore alumni
Alumni of the School of Advanced Study
Living people
Year of birth missing (living people)
Alumni of the University of London
St. Anthony's High School, Lahore alumni
Law Ministers of Pakistan
Members of the Senate of Pakistan
People from Lahore